Stephen John Scott (11 September 1955 – 16 June 1994) was a New Zealand rugby union player. A halfback, Scott represented Canterbury at a provincial level, and was a member of the New Zealand national side, the All Blacks, on the 1980 tour of Australia and Fiji. He played four matches on that tour but did not play in any internationals.

Scott died in 1994 and his ashes were buried at Wakapuaka Cemetery in Nelson.

References

1955 births
1994 deaths
Rugby union players from Christchurch
People educated at Shirley Boys' High School
New Zealand rugby union players
New Zealand international rugby union players
Canterbury rugby union players
Rugby union scrum-halves
Burials at Wakapuaka Cemetery